The 1890–91 season was the third season of football by Celtic, this marked the first season where Celtic took part in the newly formed Scottish Football League, they also competed in the Scottish Cup, Scottish League Charity Competition and Glasgow Cup.

Pre-season and friendlies

Competitions

Overview

League table

Scottish Football League

Scottish Cup

Glasgow Cup

Scottish League Charity Competition

Notes

References

Celtic F.C. seasons
Celtic